The European Universities Rowing Championships were first organised in 2005 and were held annually until 2011.  In 2012 the first European Universities Games (a multi-sport event) were held, and thereafter the Games will take place in even years, with the European Universities Championships in individual sports (including rowing) taking place in odd years.

The European Universities Rowing Championships are coordinated by the European University Sports Association along with the 18 other sports on the program of the European universities championships.

Summary

Results 2005 - Cardiff

Results 2006 - Brive

Results 2007 - Girona/Banyoles

Results 2008 - Zagreb

Results 2009 - Kruszwica

Results 2010 - Amsterdam

Results 2011 - Moscow

Results 2013 - Poznan

Results 2014 - Rotterdam

Results 2015 - Hannover

Results 2016 - Zagrep & Rijeka

Results 2017 - Subotica

Results 2018 - Coimbra

Results 2019 - Jönköping

External links 
 EUSA official website

References

2018 results Coimbra
2019 results Jönköping

rowing
Rowing competitions